Destry Rides Again is a 1939 American Western comedy film directed by George Marshall and starring Marlene Dietrich and James Stewart. The supporting cast includes Mischa Auer, Charles Winninger, Brian Donlevy, Allen Jenkins, Irene Hervey, Billy Gilbert, Bill Cody Jr., Lillian Yarbo, and Una Merkel.

The opening credits list the story as "Suggested by Max Brand's novel Destry Rides Again", but the movie is almost completely different. It also bears no resemblance to the 1932 adaptation of the novel starring Tom Mix, which is often retitled as Justice Rides Again.
 
In 1996, Destry Rides Again was selected for preservation in the United States National Film Registry by the Library of Congress as being "culturally, historically, or aesthetically significant".

Plot

Saloon owner Kent, the unscrupulous boss of the fictional Western town of Bottleneck, has the town's sheriff, Mr. Keogh, killed when Keogh asks one too many questions about a rigged poker game. Kent and Frenchy, a cheap saloon tramp who is his girlfriend, now have a stranglehold over the local cattle ranchers. The town's crooked mayor, Hiram J. Slade, who is in collusion with Kent, appoints the town drunk, Washington Dimsdale, as the new sheriff, assuming that he will be easy to control and manipulate. However, Dimsdale, a deputy under the famous lawman Tom Destry, promptly swears off drinking, and is able to call upon the latter's equally formidable son, Tom Destry Jr., to help him make Bottleneck a lawful, respectable town.

Destry arrives in Bottleneck with Jack Tyndall, a cattleman, and his sister, Janice. Destry initially confounds the townsfolk by refusing to strap on a gun and maintaining civility in dealing with everyone, including Kent and Frenchy. This quickly makes him a disappointment to Dimsdale and a laughingstock to the townspeople; he is mockingly asked to "clean up" Bottleneck by being given a mop and bucket. However, after a number of rowdy horsemen ride into town shooting their pistols in the air, he demonstrates uncanny expertise in marksmanship and threatens to jail them if they do it again, earning the respect of Bottleneck's citizens.

Through the townsmen's evasive answers regarding the whereabouts of Keogh, Destry gradually begins to suspect that Keogh was murdered. He confirms this by provoking Frenchy into admitting it, but without a location for the body, he lacks any proof. Destry therefore deputizes Boris, a Russian immigrant whom Frenchy had earlier humiliated, and implies to Kent that he had found the body outside of town "in remarkably good condition". When Kent sends a member of his gang to check on Keogh's burial site, Boris and Dimsdale follow, capture, and jail him.

Although the gang member is charged with Keogh's murder (in the hope that he would implicate Kent in exchange for clemency), Mayor Slade appoints himself judge of the trial, making an innocent verdict a foregone conclusion. To prevent this, Destry calls in a judge from a larger city in secret, but the plan is ruined after Boris accidentally gives away the other judge's name in the saloon. Kent orders Frenchy to invite the deputy to her house while other gang members storm the sheriff's office and cause a breakout; now in love with Destry, she accepts. When shots are fired, he rushes back, to find the cell empty and Dimsdale mortally wounded. Destry returns to his room and puts on his gun belt, abandoning his previous commitment to nonviolence.

Under Destry's command, the honest townsmen form a posse and prepare to attack the saloon, where Kent's gang is fortified, while Destry enters through the roof and looks for Kent. At Frenchy's urging, the townswomen march in between the groups, preventing further violence, before breaking into the saloon and subduing the gang. Kent narrowly escapes, and attempts to shoot Destry from the second floor; Frenchy takes the bullet for him, killing her, and Destry kills Kent.

Some time later, Destry is shown to be the sheriff of a now lawful Bottleneck, repeating to children the stories that Dimsdale told him of the town's violent history. He jokingly tells a story about marriage to Janice, implying a marriage between them will soon follow.

Cast
As appearing in screen credits:

 Marlene Dietrich as Frenchy, the saloon singer
 James Stewart as Thomas Jefferson "Tom" Destry Jr., the new deputy
 Mischa Auer as Boris Callahan, the henpecked Russian
 Charles Winninger as Washington "Wash" Dimsdale, the new sheriff
 Brian Donlevy as Kent, the saloon owner
 Allen Jenkins as "Gyp" Watson
 Warren Hymer as "Bugs" Watson
 Irene Hervey as Janice Tyndall
 Una Merkel as Lily Belle, "Mrs. Callahan"
 Billy Gilbert as Bartender "Loupgerou"
 Samuel S. Hinds as Judge Slade, the mayor
 Jack Carson as Jack Tyndall
 Tom Fadden as Lem Claggett
 Virginia Brissac as Sophie Claggett
 Edmund MacDonald as Rockwell
 Lillian Yarbo as Clara, Frenchy's maid
 Joe King as Sheriff Keogh
 Dickie Jones as Claggett's boy
 Ann E. Todd as Claggett's girl

Songs
Dietrich sings "See What the Boys in the Back Room Will Have" and "You've Got That Look", written by Frank Loesser, set to music by Frederick Hollander, which have become classics.

Production

Western writer Max Brand contributed the novel, Destry Rides Again, but the film also owes its origins to Brand's serial "Twelve Peers", published in a pulp magazine. In the original work, Harrison (or "Harry") Destry was not a pacifist. As filmed in 1932, with Tom Mix in the starring role, the central character differed in that Destry did wear six-guns.

The film was James Stewart's first Western (he would not return to the genre until 1950, with Winchester '73, followed by Broken Arrow). The story featured a ferocious cat-fight between Marlene Dietrich and Una Merkel, which apparently caused a mild censorship problem at the time of release.
The film also represented Dietrich's return to Hollywood after a string of flops at Paramount ("Angel", "The Scarlet Empress", "The Devil is a Woman") caused her, and a number of other stars, to be labelled "box office poison". While vacationing at Cap d'Antibes with her family, her mentor Josef von Sternberg and her lover Erich Maria Remarque, she received an offer from Joe Pasternak to come to Universal at half the salary she had been receiving for most of the 1930s. Pasternak had previously tried to sign Dietrich to Universal while she was still in Berlin. Unsure of what to do she was advised by von Sternberg "I made you into a Goddess. Now show them you have feet of clay".

According to writer/director Peter Bogdanovich, Marlene Dietrich told him during an aircraft flight that she and James Stewart had an affair during shooting and that she became pregnant but had a surreptitious abortion without telling Stewart.

Internationally, the film was released under the alternative titles Femme ou Démon in French and Arizona in Spanish.

Reception
Destry Rides Again was generally well accepted by the public, as well as critics. It was reviewed by Frank S. Nugent in The New York Times, who observed that the film did not follow the usual Hollywood type-casting. On Dietrich's role, he characterized: "It's difficult to reconcile Miss Dietrich's Frenchy, the cabaret girl of the Bloody Gulch Saloon, with the posed and posturing Dietrich we last saw in Mr. Lubitsch's 'Angel'." Stewart's contribution was similarly treated, "turning in an easy, likable, pleasantly humored performance."

Other versions
 Universal Pictures released an earlier version, also titled Destry Rides Again (1932), directed by Benjamin Stoloff and starring Tom Mix and ZaSu Pitts.
 A Lux Radio Theater version of the story was aired November 5, 1945, starred Jimmy Stewart and Joan Blondell, and can be heard on YouTube.
 An almost shot-for-shot remake of the 1939 production, Destry (1954), was also directed by George Marshall and stars Audie Murphy and Thomas Mitchell.
 A Broadway musical version of the story, Destry Rides Again, opened in New York City at the Imperial Theatre on April 23, 1959, and played 472 performances. Produced by David Merrick, the show had a book by Leonard Gershe, music and lyrics by Harold Rome, and starred Andy Griffith as Destry and Dolores Gray as Frenchy.
 ABC aired a short-lived television series in 1964, Destry, based on the 1939 and 1954 films, starring John Gavin as the son of the movie's title character.

In popular culture
Marlene Dietrich's character, Frenchy, was the inspiration for the character of Lili Von Shtupp in the Western parody Blazing Saddles.

References
Notes

Bibliography

 Beaver, Jim. "James Stewart." Films in Review, October 1980.
 Coe, Jonathan. James Stewart: Leading Man. London: Bloomsbury, 1994. .
 Eliot, Mark. Jimmy Stewart: A Biography. New York: Random House, 2006. .
 "The Jimmy Stewart Museum Home Page." jimmy.org. Retrieved: February 18, 2007.
 Jones, Ken D., Arthur F. McClure and Alfred E. Twomey. The Films of James Stewart. New York: Castle Books, 1970.
 Pickard, Roy. Jimmy Stewart: A Life in Film. New York: St. Martin's Press, 1992. .
 Prendergast, Tom and Sara, eds. "Stewart, James". International Dictionary of Films and Filmmakers, 4th edition. London: St. James Press, 2000. .
 Prendergast, Tom and Sara, eds. "Stewart, James". St. James Encyclopedia of Popular Culture, 5th edition. London: St. James Press, 2000. .
 Quirk, Lawrence J. James Stewart: Behind the Scenes of a Wonderful Life. Montclair, New Jersey: Applause Books, 2000. .
 Riva, Maria. Marlene Dietrich. New York: Ballantine Books, 1994. .
 Robbins, Jhan. Everybody's Man: A Biography of Jimmy Stewart. New York: G.P. Putnam's Sons, 1985. .
 Thomas, Tony. A Wonderful Life: The Films and Career of James Stewart. Secaucus, New Jersey: Citadel Press, 1988. .

External links

 
 
 
 
 
Destry Rides Again: Riding High an essay by Farran Smith Nehme at the Criterion Collection
 Destry Rides Again on Lux Radio Theater: November 5, 1945
 Destry Rides Again essay by Daniel Eagan in America's Film Legacy: The Authoritative Guide to the Landmark Movies in the National Film Registry, A&C Black, 2010 , pages 298-299 

1939 films
1939 Western (genre) films
1939 comedy films
American Western (genre) comedy films
American black-and-white films
1930s English-language films
Films based on American novels
Films based on Western (genre) novels
Films directed by George Marshall
Films produced by Joe Pasternak
Films scored by Frank Skinner
Films about gambling
United States National Film Registry films
Universal Pictures films
1930s American films
1930s Western (genre) comedy films